John Edward Alite (born September 30, 1962) is an American former mobster, Gambino crime family associate and a government witness who testified against the crime family and John A. "Junior" Gotti in 2008. That year, Alite pleaded guilty to racketeering charges, including two murders and a variety of other crimes, and in 2011, was sentenced to a total of 10 years in prison. Due to his cooperation with prosecutors, he was released on a five-year supervised release in 2012. Alite has estimated that he shot between 30 to 40 people, beat about 100 people with a baseball bat, and murdered six people. Later in life, Alite publicly denounced the life of organized crime and became a motivational speaker, podcaster and books author.

Early life
Alite was born on September 30, 1962 in the Queens borough of New York City and grew up in Woodhaven, Queens. His grandparents were Albanian immigrants from Gjirokastër. Alite grew up in the same neighborhood as John Gotti's son, John A. Gotti, with whom he was boyhood friends. He was Gotti's best man at his wedding in 1990. Alite received a baseball scholarship to the University of Tampa, but dropped out after three years. Alite's first wife was Carol, and his second wife was Claudia DiPippa; he has four children.

Criminal career
Alite was associated with the Gambino crime family but was ineligible to become a "made man" in the organization due to his non-Italian heritage. In the 1980s and '90s, he was an enforcer and hitman for a Queens-based drug gang headed by John A. "Junior" Gotti which allegedly distributed eight kilograms of cocaine per month. On December 20, 1988, Alite lured cocaine dealer George Grosso to the White Horse Tavern in Queens, persuaded him to get into a car under the pretence of driving to another bar, and then shot him three times in the head. Grosso's corpse was dumped off Grand Central Parkway in Flushing Meadows Park. "Junior" Gotti allegedly ordered Grosso's murder because he had told people he was selling drugs on behalf of Gotti and his father, Gambino boss John J. Gotti. Alite was also involved in the murder of Bruce John Gotterup, who was shot to death on a Rockaway boardwalk by John Burke on November 20, 1991 as retribution for stealing drug and gambling proceeds from Gambino family associates and for being involved in an altercation with the nephew of a Gambino soldier.

In the mid-1990s, Alite relocated to the Philadelphia area, where he owned homes in the suburbs of Cherry Hill and Voorhees Township. He began associating with "made" members and associates of the Philadelphia crime family, as well as the independent 10th & Oregon Crew. Infighting in the Philadelphia Mafia between rival factions led by John Stanfa and Joey Merlino left the organization in disarray and allowed Alite to take control of the lucrative valet parking business on Delaware Avenue, as well as in South Jersey and Atlantic City, within a year of moving to the area. Aside from being a source of legitimate income, Alite used his valet parking businesses as a means of laundering money he was making from drug dealing, gambling and loansharking. One member of Alite's crew, Keith Pellegrino, was a drug supplier to the 10th & Oregon gang. In 1994, 10th & Oregon Crew leader Louie Turra reportedly attempted to solicit Alite as a hitman to kill Joey Merlino in a dispute over a "street tax", an offer which Alite turned down as he felt the Turra gang were "cowboys". He was also questioned by police over the November 1, 1994 homicide of Carol Neulander in Cherry Hill. The murdered woman's husband, Fred Neulander, was ultimately convicted in the killing.

Alite later led a crew in Tampa, Florida that extorted rival valet businesses, and reported to Gambino capo Ronald Trucchio. He also arranged for the purchase of Mirage, a Tampa nightclub.

In 1995, Charles Carneglia and Alite were involved in a major conspiracy to murder John A. Gotti. Later that year, Alite was arrested for illegal possession of a firearm in violation of a parole agreement and spent three years in prison. After his release, Alite earned an additional three months back in prison for acting as a go-between for corrupt prison guard Troy Kemmerer who was smuggling sperm donation kits in and out of Allenwood Federal Prison for inmate Antonino Parlavecchio, who was trying to impregnate his wife Maria.

As federal racketeering indictments were handed down for his group's activities in the Tampa area, Alite fled to Rio de Janeiro, Brazil in January 2004, and lived and worked in the Copacabana neighborhood, according to the Brazilian Federal Police. He lived there for 10 months before authorities arrested him. He served two years in prison in Brazil and was eventually extradited to federal authorities in Tampa, for trial in 2006.

Government witness and racketeering convictions
In January 2008, Alite pleaded guilty to racketeering charges that included two murders, four murder conspiracies, at least eight shootings, and two attempted shootings as well as armed home invasions and armed robberies in New York, New Jersey, Pennsylvania and Florida, stemming from his alleged involvement in a Gambino crew in Tampa, Florida. Alite agreed to testify in the trial of Gambino family enforcer Charles Carneglia, who was found guilty of four murders and is now serving a life sentence.

Alite was also a government witness in the unsuccessful racketeering trial against John Gotti Jr. Prosecutors indicted Gotti for racketeering and murder conspiracy charges, stemming from an alleged drug trafficking ring in Florida, and the murders of George Grosso in 1988, Louis DiBono in 1990 and Bruce John Gotterup in 1991. Alite testified that Gotti was responsible for at least eight murders, among other crimes.

Alite's testimony was largely undermined during cross examination. On December 1, 2009, the 12 jurors announced that they had failed to reach a unanimous verdict on all the charges against Gotti and the judge declared a mistrial and released Gotti. Interviewed after the trial, the jurors said that they did not find Alite to be credible. Federal prosecutors from Brooklyn and Tampa described Alite's cooperation as "extraordinary" and "substantial" when submitting statements to the judge responsible for sentencing Alite for two murders and other crimes.

On April 26, 2011, Alite was sentenced to a total of 10 years in prison. In January 2012, he was released on a five-year supervised release; in October 2015, a letter was written to the U.S. Probation Office claiming that Alite broke the terms of his supervised release in a New Jersey gun case which prompted an investigation that sent Alite back to prison for three months.

Later life
Alite later became a youth motivational speaker on avoiding crime. He has four books that he co-wrote, Gotti's Rules (2015), Darkest Hour (2018), Prison Rules (2019), and Mafia International (2021). In July 2020, he appeared in the Fear City: New York vs The Mafia Netflix docuseries.  On March 25 2020 he started his own podcast, called Mafia Truths with John Alite . In September 2021, Alite was the subject of an episode of National Geographic‘s Locked Up Abroad. Later he featured in a Gamology react video on Hitman 3 where he provided commentary on the game and how it compared to his exploits as a former hitman.

References

Further reading

External links
 

1962 births
Living people
20th-century American criminals
21st-century American criminals
American male criminals
American gangsters
Gangsters from New York City
Criminals from Queens, New York
People from Woodhaven, Queens
American people convicted of murder
People convicted of racketeering
American people convicted of robbery
American people convicted of burglary
People extradited from Brazil
People extradited to the United States
American prisoners and detainees
Prisoners and detainees of the United States federal government
American Mafia cooperating witnesses
Gambino crime family
American motivational speakers
Organized crime memoirists
American memoirists
Non-fiction writers about organized crime in the United States
American male non-fiction writers
American people of Albanian descent